The 2000 European Short Track Speed Skating Championships took place between 21 and 23 January 2000 in Bormio, Italy.

Medal summary

Medal table

Men's events

Women's events

Participating nations 

  (4/4)
  (4/0)
  (0/2)
  (4/4)
  (1/2)
  (0/1)
  (4/1)
  (4/2)
  (4/4)
  (4/1)
  (1/1)
  (5/5)
  (2/0)
  (4/4)
  (1/0)
  (1/0)
  (1/2)
  (4/4)
  (4/0)
  (1/1)
  (1/0)
  (2/4)

See also
Short track speed skating
European Short Track Speed Skating Championships

External links
Detailed results
Results overview

European Short Track Speed Skating Championships
European Short Track Speed Skating Championships
European
European Short Track Speed Skating Championships